Zabrus pinguis is a  long species of ground beetle in the Euryzabrus subgenus that can be found on Portugalian-Spanish border. The species is considered vulnerable in Spain under the IUCN Red List.

References

External links
Zabrus pinguis

Beetles described in 1831
Beetles of Europe
Taxa named by Pierre François Marie Auguste Dejean
Zabrus